Promachus rufipes, known generally as the red-footed cannibalfly or bee panther, is a species of robber flies (insects in the family Asilidae).

References

External links

 

Asilidae
Articles created by Qbugbot
Insects described in 1775
Taxa named by Johan Christian Fabricius